Nwando Achebe  is a Nigerian-American academic, academic administrator, feminist scholar, and multi-award-winning historian. She is the Jack and Margaret Sweet Endowed Professor of History and the Associate Dean for Diversity, Equity, and Inclusion in the College of Social Science at Michigan State University. She is also founding editor-in-chief of the Journal of West African History.

Background 
Nwando Achebe was born in Enugu, eastern Nigeria to Nigerian writer, essayist, and poet, Chinua Achebe, and Christie Chinwe Achebe, a professor of education. She is the spouse of Folu Ogundimu, professor of journalism at Michigan State University, and mother of a daughter, Chino. Her older brother, Chidi Chike Achebe is a physician-executive.

Education and career 
Achebe received her Ph.D. in African History from the University of California, Los Angeles in 2000. An oral historian by training, her areas of expertise  are West African History, women, gender and sexuality histories. In 1996 and 1998, she served as a Ford Foundation and Fulbright-Hays Scholar-in-Residence at The Institute of African Studies and The Department of History and International Studies at the University of Nigeria, Nsukka. Her first academic position was as an Assistant Professor of History at the College of William and Mary. She then moved to Michigan State University in 2005 as a tenured Associate Professor, Professor in 2010, and is presently the Jack and Margaret Sweet Endowed Professor.

Scholarship 
She has published six books. Her first book, Farmers, Traders, Warriors, and Kings: Female Power and Authority in Northern Igboland, 1900–1960, was published by Heinemann in 2005. Heralded as a “landmark in African historiography” by Distinguished Professor and author, Isidore Okpewho, and "a major event in African gender studies publishing," by Chancellor Professor and feminist scholar, Obioma Nnaemeka, Achebe's Farmers, Traders, Warriors, and Kings represents an important contribution to understanding gender and women's history in Africa, as well as political and religious change in the colonial period. A significant and sustained intervention into debates over feminist historical methodology, the book centers what Achebe theorizes as the “female spiritual principle” and northern Igbo women's lives in ways that existing texts on Igbo history do not, by presenting both as active participants in the making of northern Igboland. Throughout the study, northern Igbo gendered histories are used to challenge received orthodoxies that characterize African women as subordinate by raising questions and presenting evidence concerning the true nature of female power and authority within this particular Igbo society. The author identifies what she considers the religious, economic and political structures that allowed women to achieve measures of power during the precolonial or tupu ndi ocha abia epoch; as well as the effect of colonialism and missionary encroachment on these old structures and on women's choices. As a piece of scholarship, Farmers, Traders, Warriors, and Kings is unsurpassed in its engagement with indigenous meaning, interpretation and understanding.

Her second book, the critically acclaimed The Female King of Colonial Nigeria: Ahebi Ugbabe, was published in 2011 by Indiana University Press. It is a full-length biography on the only female warrant chief and king in British Africa, and it has won three book awards: the Aidoo-Snyder Book Prize, The Barbara "Penny" Kanner Book Prize and the Gita Chaudhuri Book Prize. A Leeds African Studies Bulletin review of the book calls it “one of the most compellingly argued, rigorously researched scholarly writings in the fields of history and women studies in colonial Igbo society, Nigeria and Africa." The biography, a fascinating case study of an extraordinary Igbo woman, Ahebi Ugbabe (c. 1885–1948)—who during the course of her life transformed herself into a female king—reveals much about the shifting bases of gendered power under British indirect rule and the ways in which Igbo women and men negotiated and shaped the colonial environment. Drawing on extensive oral research, Achebe situates Ahebi's life within the context of multiple gendered transformations into the female masculinities of female Headman, female Warrant Chief, female King and female husband. At the same time, the biography delineates the limits of such gendered transformations. In sum, The Female King of Colonial Nigeria illuminates one woman's agency in remapping the terrain of traditional and colonial gendered politics in her district.

Dr. Achebe is a co-author of the 2018 History of West Africa E-Course Book (British Arts and Humanities Research Council, 2018), “a textbook aimed at West African students taking West African Senior School Certificate Examination (WASSCE) History Paper 1, “West Africa and the Wider World from Earliest Times to 2000.” She is also co-editor with William Worger and Charles Ambler of  A Companion to African History (Wiley Blackwell, 2019), and with Claire Robertson, Holding the World Together: African Women in Changing Perspective (University of Wisconsin Press, 2019). Achebe's 2020 Female Monarchs and Merchant Queens in Africa is published by Ohio University Press. Laura Seay of The Washington Post, writes of Female Monarchs and Merchant Queens in Africa, “A brilliant, thoroughly engaging and accessible book, ‘Female Monarchs and Merchant Queens in Africa’ is a fascinating and quick read that shows the many, many ways that women across the African continent have always led and continue to lead. It lays permanently to rest the notion of African women as passive or powerless and shows that women play key roles in every sector of society. It also makes a powerful case that African societies have more in common in this regard than differences, despite the continent's size and diversity. Finally, Achebe makes a welcome contribution to efforts to bring analysis of queer identities to African Studies, showing definitively that notions of gender and sexuality have long been fluid and adaptable on the continent."

Grants and awards 
Nwando Achebe has received grants from the Wenner Gren Foundation, Rockefeller Foundation, Woodrow Wilson, Fulbright-Hays, Ford Foundation, the World Health Organization and the National Endowment for the Humanities. She is also the recipient of three book awards.

Publications 
 Farmers, Traders, Warriors, and Kings: Female Power and Authority in Northern Igboland, 1900–1960. 
 The Female King of Nigeria: Ahebi Ugbabe. 
 History of West Africa E-Course Book. 
 A Companion to African History. 
 Holding the World Together: African Women in Changing Perspective. 
 Female Monarchs and Merchants Queens in Africa.

References 

Living people
Nigerian women writers
Feminist studies scholars
Igbo writers
American people of Igbo descent
Nigerian feminists
Nigerian emigrants to the United States
American women academics
Nigerian women academics
Nigerian women historians
21st-century Nigerian historians
Historians of Africa
Gender studies academics
Michigan State University faculty
Nigerian expatriate academics in the United States
Feminist historians
21st-century American historians
Nwando
American women historians
University of California, Los Angeles alumni
Year of birth missing (living people)
History journal editors